Elena was the Dogaressa of Venice by marriage to the Doge Agnello Participazio (r. 811-827).  Her death date is unknown.

Life
Elena commissioned the erection of Santa Giustina, Venice, situated in the Calle de Te Deum.  Along with her husband Agnello and son Giustiniano Participazio, she founded the monasteries of Sant'Ilario and San Zaccaria, and she is believed to have been buried in the latter.

She was reputed to have an interest in cultivating flowers.

Children
With Agnello, Elena had two sons:
 Giustiniano Participazio
 Giovanni I Participazio

References 
 Staley, Edgcumbe:  The dogaressas of Venice : The wives of the doges, London : T. W. Laurie, pp. 15–19.

Dogaressas of Venice
Date of death unknown
Date of death missing